The 2011–12 Cypriot Third Division was the 41st season of the Cypriot third-level football league. AEK Kouklia won their 1st title.

Format
Fourteen teams participated in the 2011–12 Cypriot Third Division. All teams played against each other twice, once at their home and once away. The team with the most points at the end of the season crowned champions. The first three teams were promoted to the 2012–13 Cypriot Second Division and the last three teams were relegated to the 2012–13 Cypriot Fourth Division.

However, in the summer, because APOP Kinyras (which would participate in the 2012–13 Cypriot Third Division) was relegated to the 2012–13 Cypriot Fourth Division after FIFA's decision, the 12th placed team Achyronas Liopetriou played a single relegation playoff match against the 4th placed team of the 2011–12 Cypriot Fourth Division, P.O. Xylotymvou for a place in the 2012–13 Cypriot Third Division.

Point system
Teams received three points for a win, one point for a draw and zero points for a loss.

Changes from previous season
Teams promoted to 2011–12 Cypriot Second Division
 Ethnikos Assia
 Enosis Neon Parekklisia
 Ayia Napa

Teams relegated from 2010–11 Cypriot Second Division
 ASIL Lysi
 Digenis Akritas Morphou
 Adonis Idaliou

Teams promoted from 2010–11 Cypriot Fourth Division
 Ormideia FC
 POL/AE Maroni
 Achyronas Liopetriou

Teams relegated to 2011–12 Cypriot Fourth Division
 Digenis Oroklinis
 MEAP Nisou
 Iraklis Gerolakkou

Stadia and locations

League standings

Results

Relegation playoff

Source: Result at CFA

See also
 Cypriot Third Division
 2011–12 Cypriot First Division
 2011–12 Cypriot Cup for lower divisions

Sources

3. DIVISION

Cypriot Third Division seasons
Cyprus
2011–12 in Cypriot football